Kabud Kamar (also Romanized as Kabūd Kamar; also known as Kukmar) is a village in Duzaj Rural District, Kharqan District, Zarandieh County, Markazi Province, Iran. At the 2006 census, its population was 729, in 171 families.

References 

Populated places in Zarandieh County